Due to the presence of Albanian immigrants in Greece and the Greek minority in Albania, historical and cultural ties as well as the frequent high-level contacts between the governments of Albania and Greece, the two countries today maintain excellent diplomatic relations.

Both countries are members of many international organizations, including the Council of Europe and NATO, and share common political views about the Balkans and the world, with Greece being a strong supporter of the EU candidacy of Albania, by proposing "Agenda 2014" for promoting the integration of all the Western Balkan states into the European Union. Under the Greek EU Presidency, Albania was granted official EU candidate status on 24 June 2014, which coincided with the 10th anniversary of "Agenda 2014" proposed by the Greek Government as part of the 2004 EU-Western Balkans Summit in Thessaloniki.

Greece is Albania's largest foreign investor and main trading partner. Along with Italy, Greece has strongly supported Albanian Euro-Atlantic integration such as Albania's entry to NATO in 2009. Cooperation between the two governments and business sector exists in numerous fields such as market, energy, military, tourism and culture, with large bi-lateral projects such as the Trans Adriatic Pipeline and hydroelectric power plants being implemented. Greece has also been Albania's largest donors as well as the leading donor of the National Theater of Albania.

Modern diplomatic relations between the two countries were established in 1971 and today are regarded as positive. Despite the two peoples sharing common traditions, culture, history, and inter-ethnic relations, diplomatic tensions relating to the Greek communities in Albania and Albanian communities in Greece continue to play a role in how both countries and people view one another. Current issues in diplomatic ties of the two NATO states include the abolition of the status of war that remains in effect between Greece and Albania, due to the Greco-Italian War in 1940 and the human right issues the Greek minority faces in Albania. Despite some obstacles, and contrary to media portrayal, Albanians and Greeks continue to maintain intertwined relations in their respective countries, with a growing push by academics, cultural groups, NGO's, ethnic minorities, mixed families and other non-state actors to forge closer and stronger social and political ties.

History

Both countries and peoples claim autochthonous status in their respective countries and the wider Balkan region which has led to shared kinship as well as contested claims throughout history.

As a result of the close proximity of the two countries and peoples, European genetic research has shown a significant degree of genetic similarity between Albanians and Greeks, as well as other southern European populations such as southern Italians and Cypriots.

Since the nineteenth century, both countries have been separate nation-states, but for at least twenty-two centuries Albania and Greece belonged to the same state in various forms that it took. The ancient Greeks and Illyrian tribes that inhabited both countries were Indo-European tribes who intermarried with pre-Hellenic populations after arriving in the Balkans about four thousand years ago. Multiple migration events occurred then, as they have more recently, between both countries and peoples; with Greek colonies being established along the cost of Illyria, which corresponds to modern day coastal Albania.

In the Middle Ages, Albanians such as the population group Arvanites migrated across Greece, establishing themselves throughout the country and playing a significant role in the Greek War for Independence and establishment of the modern Greek state. In addition, other Christian Albanians also took part in the Greek struggle against the Ottoman Empire.

After Albanian declaration of independence in 1912 land division between Albania and Greece was finally solved under the force of the Great Powers (Austria-Hungary and Italy) with the Florence Protocol. Relations did not improve until 1939 with the occupation of Albania by Italy. Greek and Albanian forces came into conflict during the Greco-Italian War even though during the Axis Occupation of Greece the Greek and Albanian resistance groups were in close contact and even exchanged information about the Nazi occupation forces.

The People's Socialist Republic of Albania, being an ally of the Soviet Union, was involved in the Greek Civil War (1946–1949) by supporting the communist led Greek Democratic Army. Leskovik, in southern Albania became for a period its headquarters. Several invasions were mounted from Albanian soil into the Greek region of Grammos. The communist guerrillas fled back to Albania once an operation was completed.  Negotiations leading up to the re-establishment of the full diplomatic relations started in 1953 while the trade agreement was reached in Paris in 1966. That trade agreement was not implemented due to the absence of payment agreement. The new trade agreement was reached in 1970, again in Paris, which led to establishment of telegraphic and telephone lines, opening of trade bureaus in Athens and Tirana while in early April a first truck with Albanian goods in the post-World War II reached Greece over Yugoslavia. Following a freeze lasting more than 30 years, the two countries re-established diplomatic relations on 6 of May 1971, at an instance where economic cooperation and strategic calculations made Enver Hoxha and the right-wing Greek military junta of 1967–1974 explore paths of cooperation.

Confederation aspirations
There had been numerous discussions, research and attempts by Albanians and Greeks to form a confederation during the Ottoman period. In the 19th century there were plans to create a Greek-Albanian confederation, which was revived from the earlier 18th century plans. In 1907 a special protocol and memorandum of understanding was signed by Neoklis Kazazis and Ismail Qemali, the first Prime Minister of Albania. Furthermore, Arvanite author Aristides Kollias in his book "The proclamation of the Association of Arvanites" states "from 1881 to 1907 we have sustained efforts and repeated consultations between Greeks and Albanians to create a Greek-Albanian state." In addition, Thanos Paleologos-Anagnostopoulos in his book "Greece and Albania in the early 20th century (1995)" stated that Ismail Qemali, a philhellene, worked with numerous Greek politicians and lobbyists, including Arvanite leaders, on a possible Greek-Albanian federation, one that "maintains national and religious independence of the two peoples." Likewise, Neoklis Kazazis saw this as a way of Greece quashing Italian influence in the region.

1990s

After the fall of communism in Albania in 1992, a large number of economic refugees and immigrants from Albania (and other formerly Communist countries including Bulgaria, Georgia, Moldova, Poland, Romania, Russia and Ukraine) arrived in Greece, mostly as illegal immigrants, to seek employment. Albanians in Greece comprise 60–65% of the total number of immigrants in Greece. According to the 2001 census, there are officially 443,550 holders of Albanian citizenship in Greece.

In the 1990s, Greece preferred and assisted Fatos Nano as Albanian leader due to him being Orthodox over Sali Berisha, a Muslim, as Nano was seen as being friendlier to Greek interests. During the Albanian Rebellion of 1997, Greece participated in the multinational peacekeeping and humanitarian Operation Alba. Also, before the Operation Alba, Greece participated in the "Operation Kosmas" at 15 March 1997, which was the evacuation of 240 Foreign dignitaries from Albania. Today, both nations have described their relations as 'excellent' with Albania considering Greece one of its 'strongest and most important allies', as both are NATO member-states and are enjoying close relations nowadays. Greece opposed for the route of the Trans Adriatic Pipeline passing through Albanian territory, as it would allow Albania to become transmission hub for gas in the Western Balkans.

Modern relations

After the football game between Serbia v Albania (UEFA Euro 2016 qualifying), Albanian nationalists carrying flags and nationalist banners attacked local ethnic Greeks, attacked houses, smashed car windows. The incident triggered diplomatic intervention from Greece with the Greek foreign ministry sending a démarche to the foreign ministry of Albania and demanded the trial of those responsible for the attacks. The Albanian foreign minister stated that "quick and efficient reaction of the state police, identified the responsible people".

According to the Bank of Albania, Greece continues to be the largest investor in Albania at 2017. The foreign direct investments made by Greece in Albania amounted to 1.22 billion euros in the first quarter of 2017, compared to 1.175 billion euros in 2016. Also, the interest of Greek companies to expand their activity in Albania is growing.

During massive wildfires, in August 2017, which have raged in Albania for weeks, Albanian authorities asked support from Greece. Greece sent two Canadair CL-415 aircraft and seven fire engines with their crew to assist Albania.

After the 2019 Albania earthquake, Greece sent two earthquake expert ΕΜΑΚ (Special Units for Disaster Management) units consisting of 40 members, search and rescue dogs, a convoy of trucks and one C-130 airplane with food parcels. In addition, the Greek Foreign Minister Nikos Dendias traveled to Tirana. Furthermore, Greek doctors and medicines were sent in order to help and support the civilians. Moreover, the Greek army sent three military mobile kitchens together with their personnel. Also, a team of sixteen civil engineers sent to Albania. The Hellenic Red Cross sent more than 200 tons of basic necessities.

During the COVID-19 pandemic, Greece donated 20,000 vaccines to Albania.

Greek minority of Albania
The status of the Greek minority in Albania is one of the unresolved issues existing between both countries. The former communist regime had granted limited rights to the Greek minority within a specifically designated minority zone consisting 99 villages. Since the fall of communism, issues relating to the treatment of the Greek minority have frequently caused tension in relations between Greece and Albania. Current issues primarily involve respect for property rights, access to Greek language education outside the "minority zone", accurate census figures, and occasional violent incidents targeting the Greek minority. The position of the Greek government is that issues facing the Greek minority need to be resolved as a condition for Albania's accession to the European Union.
In 1992, Greece proposed to Albania for a UN delegation to visit the minority areas and also Greece to establish a consulate in the region, both proposal were rejected by Albania. In December of 2022, Greek Prime Minister Konstantinos Mitsotakis visited the town of Himara, becoming the first Greek Prime Minister to do so, as well as the villages of Dervican and Livadhe. He received a warm welcome from the local inhabitants, stressed that Albania must support their rights, while also expressing support for Albania's EU integration.

Military cemeteries of fallen Greek soldiers
In January 2018, following an agreement between the Greek and Albanian foreign ministers, a systematic effort to recover the bodies of fallen Greek soldiers from the Greco-Italian War was undertaken between the two countries. It is estimated that between 6,800 and 8,000 fallen Greek soldiers were hastily buried on location following their death in battle and their remains not properly identified. Work by joint Greek-Albanian teams began on 22 January in the Kelcyre Gorge, site of the Battle of Kleisoura Pass. A small number of Cham Albanian activists tried to disrupt the work but were removed by Albanian police. The remains of the Greek soldiers will be buried in the Greek military cemeteries in the Kelcyre Gorge and in the Greek minority village of Bularat (Vouliarates) near the Greek-Albanian border.

Cham issue

The Cham issue refers to a controversy which has been raised by Albania since the 1990s over the repatriation of the Cham Albanians, who were expelled from the Greek region of Epirus between 1944 and 1945, at the end of World War II, citing the collaboration of the majority of them with the occupying forces of the Axis powers. While Albania presses for the issue to be re-opened, Greece considers the matter closed. However, it was agreed to create a bilateral commission, only about the property issue, as a technical problem. The commission was set up in 1999, but has not yet functioned.

Kosovo Issue 
Albania was one of the first countries to recognize Kosovo as an independent state, meanwhile Greece maintains a neutral position on the issue, stating that it would make a decision whether to recognise independent Kosovo or not after examining the issue in depth and that its decision would come as a result of close cooperation with European and neighboring countries, bearing in mind Serbia's role in maintaining regional stability.

Since the election of Albin Kurti as Prime Minister of Kosovo, there has been a significant developments in relations between Kosovo and Greece. The Greek Foreign Minister has made several visits to Kosovo, and Greece has expressed keen interest in the normalization of relations between Kosovo and Serbia.

Diplomatic missions
Albania maintains an embassy in Athens and consulates in Ioannina and Thessaloniki. Greece maintains an embassy in Tirana and consulates in Gjirokastër and Korçë.

Bilateral relations and cooperation

The relations have significantly improved since 1991; Greece and Albania signed a Friendship, Cooperation, Good Neighborliness and Security Agreement on 21 March 1996.  Additionally, Greece is Albania's main foreign investor, having invested more than 400 million dollars in Albania, Albania's second largest trading partner, with Greek products accounting for some 21% of Albanian imports, and 12% of Albanian exports coming to Greece, and Albania's fourth largest donor country, having provided aid amounting to 73.8 million euros.

Greece is a staunch supporter of the Euro-Atlantic integration of the Republic of Albania, and since Albania's NATO entry in May 2009, Albanian-Greek relations have been developing on all fronts. The relations, particularly after the election victory of Edi Rama in 2013, have seen massive improvement and warming of relations between the two nations for a short period of time, with the Albanian Chief of Foreign Policy, Ralf Gjoni, describing the diplomatic relations between two countries as "excellent". However, during the year 2014, only a year after Rama's election, Albania and Greece relations deteriorated and became increasingly strained, due to Rama's refusal of the agreement that defined the Maritime borders and set the Exclusive Economic Zone between the two countries, which Albania's previous government signed with Greece in 2009. Despite the difficulties in the relations between the two countries, Greece, is regarded as Albania's most important European Union ally and partner.

Both states are co-operating in many fields, such as political, judicial, energy and tourism. There are regular high-level visits between the two countries, and frequent contacts between the two countries' governments, parliaments and the local authorities on various matters concerning individual sectors and mutual interests. Big projects currently in running between the two countries include the touristic development of the Ionian coastline shared between the two countries, and the Trans Adriatic Pipeline (TAP). Official meetings between the two governments and the parliaments are frequent and the armies of both states are conducting co-training in a regular basis as part of the NATO training programme for the modernization of the Albanian Army Forces.

Under the Greek EU Presidency, Albania, on 24 June 2014 was granted the official EU candidate status which coincides with the 10th anniversary of the "Agenda 2014" proposed by the Greek Government for boosting the integration of Albania and all the Western Balkan states into the European Union.

Notable visits

State visit by Nikos Kotzias
In July 2015, Greek Foreign Minister Nikos Kotzias visited Albania for two days (14–16) as part of his Western Balkans tour. During his visit both nations reaffirmed their close ties, saying there are no open issues or taboo topics between the two. They agreed the sea issue will be sorted in due course, but both Ministers stressed the close, strategic and friendly ties of the people. Kotzias made note of the Greek National Minority, Albanians in Greece and their common past and future as bridges to sustainable, strong and fruitful relations.

Bilateral agreement on maritime borders
The long-standing dispute between Albania and Greece over the division of maritime borders was an obstacle to the Albanian aspirations for European integration. Negotiations between the two parties began in earnest in 2007, culminating in the Agreement of 2009 entitled “On the delimitation of their respective areas, the continental shelf and other maritime areas belonging to international law”. Following the Agreement, Greece expressed its firm support for the integration of Albania into the European Union together with other Balkan countries. However, the Constitutional Court of Albania declared in 2010 that the Agreement of 2009 was incompatible with the Constitution of the Republic of Albania.

See also
Foreign relations of Albania
Foreign relations of Greece
Greeks in Albania
Albanians in Greece
Accession of Albania to the European Union

References

Further reading
Franck, Debie. "Greece, Italy and Europe in the Face of the Albanian Problem". Geopolitics 5, no. 2 (2000): 186–202
Roudometof, Victor Collective memory, national identity, and ethnic conflict: Greece, Bulgaria and the Macedonian Question pp. 155–164
Xhudo, Gus. "Tension Among Neighbours: Greek-Albanian Relations and their Impact on Regional Security and Stability". Studies in Conflict and Terrorism 18 (1995):111–143
Nafpliotis, Alexandros. “Greece and Albania would both benefit substantially from closer relations”. LSE EUROPP Blog 25 September 2013

External links
 Greek Ministry of Foreign Affairs about the relation with Albania

 
Greece
Albania